Oleksandr Oleksandrovych Safronov (born 11 June 1999) is a Ukrainian professional footballer who plays as a defender for Nemzeti Bajnokság I club Zalaegerszeg.

Club career
Safronov is a product of the FC Metalurh Zaporizhia and the FC Dnipro academy systems. In March 2017, he was promoted to the senior squad of FC Dnipro but never made his debut in the Ukrainian Premier League.

Dnipro-1
In June 2017, Safronov joined the newly-created Dnipro-1. He made his debut for the club as a second-half substitute in a Ukrainian Second League match against Metalist 1925 Kharkiv on 15 July. In January 2020, he moved on loan to Meistriliiga club Levadia Tallinn, where he played 8 games and scored 2 goal in the 2020 season.

Following his stint in Estonia, Safronov returned to Dnipro-1 in Ukraine.

Desna Chernihiv
On 14 July 2021 he signed a two-year contract with Desna Chernihiv in the Ukrainian Premier League. On 25 July, he made his league debut against Chornomorets Odesa at the Stadion Yuri Gagarin.

Nafta 1903 (on loan)
On 26 March 2022, Safronov moved on loan to Slovenian club Nafta 1903. On 18 April, he made his debut against Ilirija.

Zalaegerszeg
On 10 June 2022 he signed a two-year contract with Zalaegerszeg in the Nemzeti Bajnokság I.

International career
On 15 June 2019, Safronov won the 2019 FIFA U-20 World Cup with the Ukraine under-20 national team.

Career statistics

Club

Honours

Club

Dnipro-1 
Ukrainian Second League: 2017–18

International

Ukraine U20 
FIFA U-20 World Cup: 2019

Ukraine U17 
 Valeriy Lobanovskyi Memorial Tournament: 2018

References

External links
Profile on Official FC Desna Chernihiv website
 
 

1999 births
Living people
Footballers from Zaporizhzhia
Ukrainian footballers
FC Zirka Kropyvnytskyi players
SC Dnipro-1 players
Ukrainian Premier League players
Ukrainian First League players
Ukrainian Second League players
Slovenian Second League players
Nemzeti Bajnokság I players
FCI Levadia Tallinn players
Meistriliiga players
FC Desna Chernihiv players
NK Nafta Lendava players
Zalaegerszegi TE players
Ukrainian expatriate footballers
Expatriate footballers in Estonia
Ukrainian expatriate sportspeople in Estonia
Expatriate footballers in Slovenia
Ukrainian expatriate sportspeople in Slovenia
Expatriate footballers in Hungary
Ukrainian expatriate sportspeople in Hungary
Ukraine youth international footballers
Ukraine under-21 international footballers
Association football defenders
Dnipro Academy people